Bring the Noise is a British comedy panel game show presented by Ricky Wilson. The programme made its debut on Sky 1 on 22 October 2015.

On 7 April 2016, Sky 1 announced that, due to low ratings, the show would not be returning for a second series.

Format
In each and every episode, two teams of three compete and they are captained by Tinie Tempah and Nicole Scherzinger, alongside regular panelists Joel Dommett and Katherine Ryan. Their guests each week take part in rounds involving music trivia questions, games with musical set pieces and VTs which include spoof video parodies and mash-ups. The last round of each show sees the teams compete in a musical performance battle.

Episodes
The coloured backgrounds denote the result of each of the shows:

 – indicates Ricky's Team of the Week
 – indicates a tie as Ricky's Team of the Week

International versions 
The TV format was exported in Italy when it was aired on Italia 1 and hosted by Alvin on 2016-2017.

Notes

References

External links
 
 
 

2010s British comedy television series
2015 British television series debuts
2016 British television series endings
British panel games
2010s British game shows
English-language television shows
Sky UK original programming